Boye Mafe (born November 30, 1998) is an American football outside linebacker for the Seattle Seahawks of the National Football League (NFL). He played college football at Minnesota.

Early life and high school
Mafe's parents, Wale and Bola, came to the United States from Nigeria. Mafe grew up in Golden Valley, Minnesota and attended Hopkins High School in Minnetonka, Minnesota. As a senior he was named All-Metro after recording 78 tackles, 10 tackles for loss, and four sacks.

College career
Mafe redshirted his true freshman season. As a redshirt sophomore he recorded 14 tackles, 3.5 tackles for loss, and three sacks. Mafe was named honorable mention All-Big Ten Conference after recording 27 tackles, 5.5 for loss, and 4.5 sacks with two passes defended and two forced fumbles in six games played in the team's COVID-19-shortened 2020 season.

Professional career

Mafe was drafted 40th overall by the Seattle Seahawks in the second round of the 2022 NFL Draft.

References

External links
 Seattle Seahawks bio
Minnesota Golden Gophers bio

Living people
Players of American football from Minnesota
Sportspeople from the Minneapolis–Saint Paul metropolitan area
American football defensive ends
Minnesota Golden Gophers football players
People from Golden Valley, Minnesota
1998 births
Seattle Seahawks players
American sportspeople of Nigerian descent